Estonia participated in the IX. Summer Paralympic Games in Barcelona, Spain. Estonian flag bearer at the opening ceremony was Nadežda Maksimova.

Estonia entered 6 athletes in the following sports:

Athletics: 2 female and 1 male
Swimming: 2 female and 1 male

Medalists

Silver
 Annely Ojastu – Swimming, Women's 100 m TS4  
 Marge Kõrkjas – Swimming, Women's 50 m Freestyle B2

Bronze
 Marge Kõrkjas – Swimming, Women's 100 m Freestyle B2

Top 8 Finishes

4th place
 Nadežda Maksimova – Swimming, Women's 400 m Medley B1-3

5th place
 Helena Silm – Athletics, Women's Long Jump B3 
 Nadežda Maksimova – Swimming, Women's 50 m Freestyle B3  
 Nadežda Maksimova – Swimming, Women's 100 m Freestyle B3 
 Nadežda Maksimova – Swimming, Women's 100 m Butterfly B2-3
 Nadežda Maksimova – Swimming, Women's 200 m Medley B3
 Marge Kõrkjas – Swimming, Women's 200 m Backstroke B1-2

6th place
 Jaan Jensen – Athletics, Men's Shot Put B2
 Jaan Jensen – Athletics, Men's Javelin Throw B2
 Helena Silm – Athletics, Women's 100 m B3
 Marge Kõrkjas – Swimming, Women's 100 m Backstroke B2

7th place
 Jaan Jensen – Athletics, Men's Discus Throw B2

Results by event

Athletics
 Jaan Jensen
 Men's Discus Throw B2 – Final: 36.54 (→ 7. place )  
 Men's Shot Put B2 – Final: 10.48 (→ 6. place )
 Men's Javelin Throw B2 – Final: 41.96 (→ 6. place )
 Helena Silm
 Women's 100 m B3 – Final: 14,00 (→ 6. place ) 
 Women's Long Jump B3 – Final: 4.55 (→ 5. place )
 Annely Ojastu
 Women's 100 m TS4 – Heats: 3rd 13,56 ; Final: 13,11 (→  Silver Medal )

Swimming 
 Jaak Kotelnikov
 Men's 50 m Freestyle S8 – Heats: 15th 37,74 (→ did not advance, 15. place )
 Men's 100 m Freestyle S8 – Heats: 17th 1.24,38 (→ did not advance, 17. place )
 Men's 200 m Medley SM7 – Heats: 15th 4.14,82 (→ did not advance, 15. place )
 Nadežda Maksimova
 Women's 50 m Freestyle B3 – Heats: 5th 31,54 ; Final: 31,12 (→ 5. place ) 
 Women's 100 m Freestyle B3 – Heats: 5th 1.09,92 ; Final: 1.08,75 (→ 5. place )
 Women's 400 m Freestyle B2-3 – Heats: 9th 5.58,73 (→ did not advance, 9. place )
 Women's 100 m Butterfly B2-3 – Heats: 5th 1.20,87 ; Final: 1.20,09 (→ 5. place )
 Women's 200 m Medley B3 – Final: 3.01,66 (→ 5. place )
 Women's 400 m Medley B1-3 – Final: 6.34,13 (→ 4. place )
 Marge Kõrkjas
 Women's 50 m Freestyle B2 – Heats: 2nd 32,25 ; Final: 31,24 (→  Silver Medal )
 Women's 100 m Freestyle B2 – Heats: 3rd 1.12,59 ; Final: 1.10,59 (→  Bronze Medal )
 Women's 100 m Backstroke B2 – Final: 1.26,46 (→ 6. place )
 Women's 200 m Backstroke B1-2 – Heats: 5th 3.04,26 ; Final: 3.04,57 (→ 5. place )

See also
1992 Summer Paralympics
Estonia at the Paralympics
Estonia at the 1992 Summer Olympics

External links
International Paralympic Committee
 Estonian Paralympic Committee

Nations at the 1992 Summer Paralympics
1992
1992 in Estonian sport